Staria may refer to:

 Hyundai Staria, model of motor vehicle
 Staria lunata, species